Narrative of the Life of Frederick Douglass is an 1845 memoir and treatise on abolition written by African-American orator and former slave Frederick Douglass during his time in Lynn, Massachusetts. It is generally held to be the most famous of a number of narratives written by former slaves during the same period. In factual detail, the text describes the events of his life and is considered to be one of the most influential pieces of literature to fuel the abolitionist movement of the early 19th century in the United States.

Narrative of the Life of Frederick Douglass encompasses eleven chapters that recount Douglass's life as a slave and his ambition to become a free man. It contains two introductions by well-known white abolitionists: a preface by William Lloyd Garrison, and a letter by Wendell Phillips, both arguing for the veracity of the account and the literacy of its author.

Chapters 1–4
Douglass begins by explaining that he does not know the date of his birth (he later chose February 14, 1818), and that his mother died when he was 7 years old. He has very few memories of her (children were commonly separated from their mothers), only of the rare nighttime visit. He thinks his father is a white man, possibly his owner. At a very early age, he sees his Aunt Hester being whipped. Douglass details the cruel interaction that occurs between slaves and slaveholders, as well as how slaves are supposed to behave in the presence of their masters. Douglass says that fear is what kept many slaves in forced servitude, for when they told the truth they were punished by their owners.

Chapters 5–7

At this point in the Narrative, Douglass is moved to Baltimore, Maryland. This move is rather important for him because he believes that if he had not been moved, he would have remained a slave his entire life. He even starts to have hope for a better life in the future. He also discusses his new mistress, Mrs. Sophia Auld, who begins as a very kind woman but eventually turns cruel. Douglass learns the alphabet and how to spell small words from this woman, but her husband, Mr. Auld, disapproves and states that if slaves could read, they would not be fit to be slaves, being unmanageable and sad. Upon hearing why Mr. Auld disapproves of slaves being taught how to read, Douglass realizes the importance of reading and the possibilities that this skill could help him. He takes it upon himself to learn how to read and learn all he can, but at times, this newfound skill torments him. Douglass then gains an understanding of the word abolition and develops the idea to run away to the North. He also learns how to write and how to read well.

Chapters 8–9

When Douglass is ten or eleven, his master dies and his property is left to be divided between the master's son and daughter. The slaves are valued along with the livestock, causing Douglass to develop a new hatred of slavery. He feels lucky when he is sent back to Baltimore to live with the family of Master Hugh.

He is then moved through a few situations before he is sent to St. Michael's. His regret at not having attempted to run away is evident, but on his voyage he makes a mental note that he traveled in the North-Easterly direction and considers this information to be of extreme importance. For some time, he lives with Master Thomas Auld who is particularly cruel, even after attending a Methodist camp. Douglass is pleased when he eventually is lent to Mr. Covey for a year, simply because he would be fed. Mr. Covey is known as a "negro-breaker", who breaks the will of slaves.

Chapters 10–11

While under the control of Mr. Covey, Douglass is a field hand and has an especially hard time at the tasks required of him. He is harshly whipped almost on a weekly basis, apparently due to his awkwardness. He is worked and beaten to exhaustion, which finally causes him to collapse one day while working in the fields. Because of this, he is brutally beaten once more by Covey. Douglass eventually complains to Thomas Auld, who subsequently sends him back to Covey. A few days later, Covey attempts to tie up Douglass, but he fights back. After a two-hour long physical battle, Douglass ultimately conquers Covey. After this fight, he is never beaten again. Douglass is not punished by the law, which is believed to be due to the fact that Covey cherishes his reputation as a "negro-breaker", which would be jeopardized if others knew what happened. When his one-year contract ends under Covey, Douglass is sent to live on William Freeland's plantation. Douglass comments on the abuse suffered under Covey, a religious man, and the relative peace under the more favorable, but more secular, Freeland. On Freeland's plantation, Douglass befriends other slaves and teaches them how to read. Douglass and a small group of slaves make a plan to escape, but before doing so, they are caught and Douglass is put in jail. Following his release about a week later, he is sent to Baltimore once more, but this time to learn a trade. He becomes an apprentice in a shipyard under Mr. Gardner where he is disliked by several white apprentices due to his slave status and race; at one point he gets into a fight with them and they nearly gouge out his left eye. Woefully beaten, Douglass goes to Master Hugh, who is kind regarding this situation and refuses to let Douglass return to the shipyard. Master Hugh tries to find a lawyer but all refuse, saying they can only do something for a white person. Sophia Auld, who had turned cruel under the influence of slavery, feels pity for Douglass and tends to the wound at his left eye until he is healed. At this point, Douglass is employed as a caulker and receives wages, but is forced to give every cent to Master Auld in due time. Douglass eventually finds his own job and plans the date in which he will escape to the North. He succeeds in reaching New Bedford, but he does not give details of how he does so in order to protect those who help him to allow the possibility for other slaves to escape by similar means. Douglass unites with his fiancée and begins working as his own master. He attends an anti-slavery convention and eventually becomes a well-known orator and abolitionist.

Appendix

Douglass's appendix clarifies that he is not against religion as a whole; instead he referred to "the slaveholding religion of this land, and with no possible reference to Christianity proper". He condemns the hypocrisy in southern Christianity between what is taught and the actions of the slaveowners who practice it. He compares their Christianity to the practices of "the ancient scribes and Pharisees" and quotes passages from Matthew 23 calling them hypocrites. At the end, he includes a satire of a hymn "said to have been drawn, several years before the present anti-slavery agitation began, by a northern Methodist preacher, who, while residing at the south, had an opportunity to see slaveholding morals, manners, and piety, with his own eyes", titled simply "A Parody". It criticizes religious slaveowners, each stanza ending with the phrase "heavenly union", mimicking the original's form.

Publication history

The Narrative of the Life of Frederick Douglass was published on May 1, 1845, and within four months of this publication, five thousand copies were sold. By 1860, almost 30,000 copies were sold.  After publication, he left Lynn, Massachusetts and sailed to England and Ireland for two years in fear of being recaptured by his owner in the United States. While in Britain and Ireland, he gained supporters who paid $710.96 to purchase his emancipation from his legal owner. One of the more significant reasons Douglass published his Narrative was to offset the demeaning manner in which white people viewed him. When he spoke in public, his white abolitionist associates established limits to what he could say on the platform. More specifically, they did not want him to analyze the current slavery issues or to shape the future for black people. However, once Narrative of the Life of Frederick Douglass was published, he was given the liberty to begin more ambitious work on the issue rather than giving the same speeches repetitively. Because of the work in his Narrative, Douglass gained significant credibility from those who previously did not believe the story of his past. While Douglass was in Ireland, the Dublin edition of the book was published by the abolitionist printer Richard D. Webb to great acclaim and Douglass would write extensively in later editions very positively about his experience in Ireland. His newfound liberty on the platform eventually led him to start a black newspaper against the advice of his "fellow" abolitionists. The publication of Narrative of the Life of Frederick Douglass opened several doors, not only for Douglass's ambitious work, but also for the anti-slavery movement of that time.

Reactions to the text
Narrative of the Life of Frederick Douglass received many positive reviews, but there was a group of people who opposed Douglass's work. One of his biggest critics, A. C. C. Thompson, was a neighbor of Thomas Auld, who was the master of Douglass for some time. As seen in "Letter from a Slave Holder" by A. C. C. Thompson, found in the Norton Critical Edition of Narrative of the Life of Frederick Douglass, An American Slave, he claimed that the slave he knew was "an unlearned, and rather an ordinary negro". Thompson was confident that Douglass "was not capable of writing the Narrative". He also disputed the Narrative when Douglass described the various cruel white slave holders that he either knew or knew of. Prior to the publication of Narrative of the Life of Frederick Douglass, the public could not fathom how it was possible for a former slave to appear to be so educated. Upon listening to his oratory, many were skeptical of the stories he told. After Douglass's publication, however, the public was swayed. Also found in The Norton Critical Edition, Margaret Fuller, a prominent book reviewer and literary critic of that era, had a high regard of Douglass's work. She claimed, "we have never read [a narrative] more simple, true, coherent, and warm with genuine feeling". She also suggested that "every one may read his book and see what a mind might have been stifled in bondage — what a man may be subjected to the insults of spendthrift dandies, or the blows of mercenary brutes, in whom there is no whiteness except of the skin, no humanity in the outward form". Douglass's work in this Narrative was an influential piece of literature in the anti-slavery movement.

Influence on contemporary black studies

Angela Y. Davis analyzed Douglass's Narrative in two lectures delivered at UCLA in 1969, titled "Recurring Philosophical Themes in Black Literature." Those lectures were subsequently published during Davis's imprisonment in 1970–1971 as the 24-page pamphlet Lectures on Liberation. The lectures, along with a 2009 introduction by Davis, were republished in Davis's 2010 new critical edition of the Narrative.

The first chapter of this text has also been mobilized in several major texts that have become foundational texts in contemporary Black studies: Hortense Spillers in her article "Mama's Baby, Papa's Maybe: An American Grammar Book” (1987); Saidiya Hartman in her book Scenes of Subjection: Terror, Slavery, and Self-Making in Nineteenth-Century America (1997), and Fred Moten in his book In the Break: The Aesthetics of the Black Radical Tradition (2003).  Each author uniquely contends with and navigates through Douglass’s writing. Specifically, each author has a divergent approach to revisiting or reproducing narratives of the suffering enslaved body. These divergences on Douglass are further reflected in their differing explorations of the conditions where subject and object positions of the enslaved body are produced and/or troubled. Spillers mobilizes Douglass’s description of his and his siblings’ early separation from their mother and subsequent estrangement from each other to articulate how the syntax of subjectivity, in particular “kinship”, has a historically specific relationship to the objectifying formations of chattel slavery which denied genetic links and familial bonds between the enslaved. This denial was part of the processes that worked to reinforce the enslaved position as property and object. Spillers frames Douglass’s narrative as writing that, although frequently returned to, still has the ability to “astonish” contemporary readers with each return to this scene of enslaved grief and loss (Spillers, “Mama’s Baby”, 76). By tracing the historical conditions of captivity through which slave humanity is defined as “absence from a subject position” narratives like Douglass’s, chronicles of the Middle Passage, and Incidents in the Life of a Slave Girl, are framed as impression points that have not lost their affective potential or become problematically familiar through repetitions or revisions (Spillers, “Mama’s Baby”, 66). Spillers own (re)visitation of Douglass’s narrative suggests that these efforts are a critical component to her assertion that “[i]n order for me to speak a truer word concerning myself, I must strip down through layers of attenuated meanings, made an excess in time, over time, assigned by a particular historical order, and there await whatever marvels of my own inventiveness” (Spillers, "Mama's Baby", 65).

In contrast to Spiller’s articulation that repetition does not rob Douglass’s narrative of its power, Saidiya Hartman explores how an over familiarity with narratives of the suffering enslaved body is problematic. In Hartman's work, repeated “exposure of the violated body” is positioned as a process that can lead to a benumbing “indifference to suffering” (Hartman, Scenes of Objection, 4). This turn away from Douglass’ description of the violence carried out against his Aunt Hester is contextualized by Hartman's critical examination of 19th century abolitionist writings in the Antebellum South. These abolitionist narratives included extreme representations of violence carried out against the enslaved body which were included to establish the slave's humanity and evoke empathy while exposing the terrors of the institution. However, Hartman posits that these abolitionist efforts, which may have intended to convey enslaved subjectivities, actually aligned more closely to replications of objectivity since they “reinforce[d] the ‘thingly’ quality of the captive by reducing the body to evidence” (Hartman, Scenes of Subjection, 19). Instead of concentrating on these narratives that dramatized violence and the suffering black body, Hartman is more focused on revealing the quotidian ways that enslaved personhood and objectivity were selectively constructed or brought into tension in scenes like the coffle, coerced performances of slave leisure on the plantation, and the popular theater of the Antebellum South.

Fred Moten's engagement with Narrative of The Life of Frederick Douglass echoes Spillers assertion that “every writing as a revision makes the ‘discovery’ all over again” (Spillers, 69). In his book chapter “Resistance of the Object: Aunt Hester’s Scream” he speaks to Hartman's move away from Aunt Hester's experience of violence. Moten questions whether Hartman's opposition to reproducing this narrative is not actually a direct move through a relationship between violence and the captive body positioned as object, that she had intended to avoid. Moten suggests that as Hartman outlines the reasons for her opposition, her written reference to the narrative and the violence of its content may indeed be an inevitable reproduction. This is reflected in his question “of whether performance in general is ever outside the economy of reproduction” (Moten, In the Break,  4).  A key parameter in Moten's analytical method and the way he engages with Hartman's work is an exploration of blackness as a positional framework through which objectivity and humanity are performed. This suggests that an attempt to move beyond the violence and object position of Aunt Hester would always be first a move through these things. Through this framework of the performativity of blackness Moten's revisitation of Douglass’s narrative explores how the sounds of black performance might trouble conventional understandings of subjectivity and subjective speech.

See also

 My Bondage and My Freedom (1855), Douglass's next slave narrative memoir
 Self-Made Men (Frederick Douglass)
 The Heroic Slave, a heartwarming Narrative of the Adventures of Madison Washington, in Pursuit of Liberty, (1852), a fiction book by Douglass based on the experiences of Madison Washington.
 Life and Times of Frederick Douglass (1881), Douglass's fuller slave narrative memoir
 Timeline of Lynn, Massachusetts

References

External links

Sources
 
 Narrative of the Life of Frederick Douglass at Project Gutenberg (plain text and HTML).
 
 Narrative of the Life of Frederick Douglass at Internet Archive (scanned books original editions illustrated)
Commentary
 James Matlack. "The Autobiographies of Frederick Douglas". Phylon (1960), Vol. 40, No. 1 (1st Qtr., 1979), pp. 15–28. via JSTOR
 Zachary McLeod Hutchins "Rejecting the Root: The Liberating, Anti-Christ Theology of Douglass's Narrative. Nineteenth-Century Literature 68.3 (2013): 292–322.
 Narrative of the Life of Frederick Douglass, a SparkNotes study guide.
 Frederick Douglass and the White Negro, a documentary film on Frederick Douglass in Ireland.
 EDSITEment's lesson Frederick Douglass Narrative: Myth of the Happy Slave

Further reading 
 John Hansen. “Frederick Douglass’s Journey from Slave to Freeman: An Acquisition and Mastery of Language, Rhetoric, and Power via the Narrative.” The Griot: The Journal of African American Studies, vol. 31, no. 2, 2012, pp. 14-23.

1845 non-fiction books
Books about African-American history
Slave narratives
African-American autobiographies
Works by Frederick Douglass